All Saints Church is in the village of Lupton, Cumbria, England.  It is an active Anglican parish church in the deanery of Kendal, the archdeaconry of Westmorland and Furness, and the diocese of Carlisle.  Its benefice is united with those of seven local parishes, the benefice being entitled Kirkby Lonsdale Team Ministry, and known locally as the Rainbow Parish. The church is recorded in the National Heritage List for England as a designated Grade II listed building.

History

The church was built in 1867 (or 1868) and designed by the Lancaster architect E. G. Paley.

Architecture

All Saints is constructed in stone rubble with ashlar dressings, and has a slate roof. It is a small church in Neo-Norman style. Its plan consists of a three-bay nave, an apsidal chancel, a north vestry, and a south porch. The windows are round-headed.  At the west end of the church is a bellcote.  On the gable at the east end of the nave is a cross finial. The interior of the church is painted blue.  The font, which was moved here from St. Mary Kirkby Lonsdale, is dated 1686. Also in the church are painted commandment boards.

See also

Listed buildings in Lupton, Cumbria
List of ecclesiastical works by E. G. Paley

References

External links
Visit Cumbria

Church of England church buildings in Cumbria
Diocese of Carlisle
Grade II listed churches in Cumbria
Romanesque Revival church buildings in England
19th-century Church of England church buildings
Church buildings by E. G. Paley